The red-headed vulture (Sarcogyps calvus), also known as the Asian king vulture, Indian black vulture or Pondicherry vulture, is an Old World vulture mainly found in the Indian subcontinent, with small disjunct populations in some parts of Southeast Asia.

Description
It has a prominent naked head: deep-red to orange in the adult, paler red in the juvenile. It has a black body with pale grey band at the base of the flight feathers. The sexes differ in colour of the iris: males have a paler, whitish iris, whilst in females it is dark brown.

The red-headed vulture is very similar in appearance to its larger relative the Lappet-faced vulture in Africa and Arabia, even being historically placed in the genus Torgos

Taxonomy and systematics
This is a species of Old World vulture found in the Indian subcontinent. It has no subspecies.

Distribution and habitat
This gaudy-faced vulture was historically abundant, range widely across the Indian subcontinent, and also eastwards to south-central and south-eastern Asia, extending from India to Singapore. Today the range of the red-headed vulture is localized primarily to northern India.  It is usually in open country and in cultivated and semi-desert areas. It is also found in deciduous forests and foothills and river valleys. It is usually found up to an altitude of 3000m from sea level.

Conservation status

The red-headed vulture used to be declining, but only slowly; in 2004 the species was uplisted to near threatened from least concern by the IUCN. The widespread use of the NSAID diclofenac in veterinary medicine in India has caused its population to collapse in recent years, however.  Diclofenac is a compound now known to be extremely poisonous to vultures. The red-headed vulture population has essentially halved every other year since the late 1990s, and what once was a plentiful species numbering in the hundreds of thousands has come dangerously close to extinction in less than two decades. Consequently, it was uplisted to critically endangered in the 2007 IUCN Red List.

Several NSAIDs have been found to be harmful to scavenging birds. Diclofenac, carprofen, flunixin, ibuprofen and phenylbutazone were associated with mortality. Meloxicam has thus far been found to be "Vulture-Safe" and its use in veterinary treatment of livestock is being encouraged.

The red-headed vulture has started becoming more harder to come by as it is being hunted down. Places like Cambodia have put together special programs to help critically endangered vulture species. There has been evidenced compiled that showed hunters have started “ the use of poisons in hunting practices”, which has led to the population analysis showing “that since 2010 populations of the White-rumped Vulture (Gyps bengalensis) and Red-headed Vulture (Sarcogyps calvus) have declined, while the Slender-billed Vulture (Gyps tenuirostris) may also have started to decline since 2013”.

References

External links

Vulture Territory Facts and Characteristics: Pondicherry Vulture
BirdLife Species Factsheet.

red-headed vulture
Birds of South Asia
Birds of Southeast Asia
Critically endangered fauna of Asia
red-headed vulture